is a Japanese swimmer. He competed in the men's 800 metre freestyle event at the 2018 Asian Games, winning the silver medal.

References

External links
 

1995 births
Living people
Japanese male freestyle swimmers
Place of birth missing (living people)
Asian Games medalists in swimming
Asian Games silver medalists for Japan
Swimmers at the 2014 Asian Games
Swimmers at the 2018 Asian Games
Medalists at the 2018 Asian Games
21st-century Japanese people